George Henry Lindsay (January 7, 1837 – May 25, 1916) was an American businessman and politician who served six terms as a United States representative from New York from 1901 to 1913. He was the Coroner of Kings County, New York, from 1886 to 1892.

Life
He was born in Manhattan on January 7, 1837. He moved with his parents to Brooklyn in 1843. He attended the public schools and engaged in the real estate and investment business.

Political career 
He was a member of the New York State Assembly (Kings Co., 7th D.) in 1882, 1883, 1884, 1885 and 1886; and was Coroner of Kings County, New York, from 1886 to 1892. He was appointed assistant tax commissioner in 1898 and was a delegate to various national and State conventions.

Congress 
Lindsay was elected as a Democrat to the Fifty-seventh and to the five succeeding Congresses, holding office from March 4, 1901, to March 3, 1913. He declined to be a candidate for renomination in 1912 and lived in retirement until his death in Brooklyn in 1916. Interment was in Cemetery of the Evergreens, Brooklyn.

Legacy
George H. Lindsay's son, George Washington Lindsay, was also a U.S. Representative from New York.

References

Further reading

External links

1837 births
1916 deaths
Burials at the Cemetery of the Evergreens
People from Brooklyn
Democratic Party members of the New York State Assembly
Democratic Party members of the United States House of Representatives from New York (state)
Coroners of New York City
19th-century American politicians